Odontocera zeteki is a species of beetle in the family Cerambycidae. It was described by Warren Samuel Fisher based on specimen(s) from Barro Colorado Island, Panama.

References

Odontocera
Beetles described in 1930
Beetles of Central America